The Hospitals were an American noise rock band from San Francisco, California, United States, active from 2002 to 2009. They were formed by Adam Stonehouse (Drums and vocals) and Rod Meyer (Guitar) in 2002 in Portland, Oregon, US. The Hospitals have released recordings through Load Records, In the Red, Yakisakana Records, Future Primitive, and Not Not Fun.

Band members
Adam Stonehouse - vocals, guitar, drums
Chris Gunn - guitar
Alex Cargyle - guitar
Justin Flowers -drums
Alain -fifa

Past members
Tony Gladders
Taylor Brack
John Dwyer
Ned Meiners
Mike Donovan
Eric Park
Rod Meyer
Rob Enbom

Discography

Albums
The Hospitals LP/CD, 2003, In the Red
I've Visited the Island of Jocks and Jazz LP/CD, 2005, Load Records
Hairdryer Peace LP, 2008, self-released; CD, 2009 Meds

Singles and EPs
Again and Again 7", 2003, Future Primitive Recordings
The Hospitals/Big Techno Werewolves Split Tour cass, 2004, Folding Cassettes
Rich People 12" 45rpm, 2005, Yakisakana Records
Hospitals/Afrirampo "Bored Fortress Singles Series split" 7”, 2006, Not Not FunR. I. P. Cassette, 2010, Wastered

Live albumsEmployer Destroyer US Tour Cassette, 2006, Wave WavesPlease Leave Europe Tour Cassette, 2007, Wave Waves

Compilations
 Static Disaster: The UK In The Red Records Sampler, 2003 In the Red (Song, "I'm a Bug")

ReferencesThe Wire'', issue No. 303, May 2009

External links

American noise rock music groups
In the Red artists
Load Records artists